César Canevaro Valega (January 19, 1846 – October 31, 1922) was a Peruvian General and politician.  He fought in the war against Chile, using his own finances and personal relationships to fund the endeavor. 

He was President of the Chamber of Deputies in 1881, President of the Senate from 1894 to 1895, and from 1921 to 1922, Vice President of Peru 1894-1895 and 1919-1922, mayor of Lima (1881, 1886, 1887, 1888, 1889, 1894, 1895) and minister to United States.

References

1846 births
1922 deaths
Mayors of Lima
Vice presidents of Peru
Presidents of the Senate of Peru
Presidents of the Chamber of Deputies of Peru
Place of birth missing
Peruvian people of Italian descent
Peruvian generals
Freemasons